China–Guinea relations refer to the bilateral relations between China and Guinea. China and Guinea established diplomatic relations on October 14, 1959.

Chinese development finance to Guinea
Radio-Conakry reported that two countries signed a trade agreement worth 3.4 million pounds on 6 February 1971.

From 2000 to 2011, there were approximately 31 Chinese official development finance projects identified in Guinea through various media reports. These projects range from the construction of a 150-bed hospital at Kipe in 2008, to an aid package worth US$5.2 million in 2007.

Bauxite ore
China is Guinea's chief customer for its principal export, bauxite (aluminum ore), consuming half of Guinea's production, which provides half of China's aluminum (China, in turn, provides half of the world's aluminum). In the 21st century, the relationship has been facilitated by China's ties to President Condé

Human rights
In June 2020, Guinea was one of 53 countries who backed the Hong Kong national security law at the United Nations.

References

 
Guinea
Bilateral relations of Guinea